Lea Padovani (28 July 1920 – 23 June 1991) was an Italian film actress. She appeared in 60 films between 1945 and 1990. She starred in the film Black Dossier which was entered into the 1955 Cannes Film Festival.

Partial filmography

 The Innocent Casimiro (1945) - Marcella
 The Sun Still Rises (1946) - Laura
 The White Devil (1947) - Katiousha
 Call of the Blood (1948) - Maddelena
 Letter at Dawn (1948) - Anna
 I cavalieri dalle maschere nere (1948) - Violante
 Che tempi! (1948) - Anna Pastorino
 Give Us This Day (also known as Christ in Concrete) (1949) - Annuziata
 Night Taxi (1950) - (scenes deleted)
 The Accusation (1950) - Irene
 Three Steps North (1951) - Elena Ravezza
 La grande rinuncia (1951) - Elisabetta / Suor Teresa
 Honeymoon Deferred (1951) - Rosina Maggini
 I due derelitti (1951) - Elena
 Fiamme sulla laguna (1951) - Anna
 Rome 11:00 (1952) - Caterina
 I figli non si vendono (1952) - Anna
 Don Lorenzo (1952) - Mara
 Toto and the Women (1952) - Ginetta
 Papà ti ricordo (1952) - Maria
 One of Those (1953) - Maria
 Cinema d'altri tempi (1953) - Caterina
 Donne Proibite (1954) - Franca
 Mid-Century Loves (1954) - Isabella (segment "Girandola 1910")
 Gran varietà (1954) - Anna la soubrette (episodio 'Il fine dicitore')
 A Slice of Life (1954) - Maria (segment "Pupo, Il")
 The Contessa's Secret (1954) - La princesse Mathilde Bonaparte
 Il seduttore (1954) - Norma
 Guai ai vinti (1954) - Luisa
 Naples Is Always Naples (1954) - Carmela Gargiulo
 La tua donna (1954) - Luisa, sua moglie
 Barrier of the Law (1954) - Anna
 Black Dossier (1955) - Françoise Le Guen
 Chéri-Bibi (1955) - La Comtesse
 La moglie è uguale per tutti (1955) - Cristina Ferretti
 Folgore Division (1955) - Salvi's Girlfriend
 Scandal in Sorrento (1955) - Violante Ruotolo
 The Intruder (1956) - Luisa Marcelli
 Solo Dio mi fermerà (1957) - Gloria
 An Eye for an Eye (1957) - Lola Zardi
 The Lovers of Montparnasse (1958) - Rosalie
 Bread, Love and Andalusia (1958) - Donna Violante Ruotolo
 The Naked Maja (1958) - Queen Maria Luisa
 La Princesse de Clèves (1961) - La Reine Catherine de Médicis
 The Reluctant Saint (1962) - Giuseppe's Mother
 Germinal (1963) - La Maheude
 The Empty Canvas (1963) - Balestrieri's Widow
 Shivers in Summer (1964) - Alba Mannelli
 Our Men in Bagdad (1966) - Fiodorenko's partner
 Almost a Man (1966) - Michele's mother
 Gli altri, gli altri... e noi (1967)
 Candy (1968) - Silvia Fontegliulo
 So Long Gulliver (1970) - Woman
 Equinozio (1971) - Margherita
 Ehrengard (1982) - The Grand Duchess
 The King's Whore (1990) - Countess Cumiana

References

External links

1920 births
1991 deaths
Italian film actresses
Accademia Nazionale di Arte Drammatica Silvio D'Amico alumni
People from Lazio
20th-century Italian actresses